Alseroxylon (Rautensin, Rauwiloid) is a norepinephrine reuptake inhibitor that has been investigated in the treatment of hypertension and angina pectoris and as a sedative in psychoses.  It was at one time approved for use in the United States, but has since been discontinued.

Alseroxylon is a purified fat-soluble extract of the root of Rauvolfia serpentina, containing reserpine and other nonadrenolytic amorphous alkaloids.

References 

Norepinephrine reuptake inhibitors
Quinolizidine alkaloids
Tryptamine alkaloids
Indoloquinolizines
Abandoned drugs